If he were among us is a Saudi Arabian television series for youth presented by Ahmad Al Shugairi. Each program has multiple segments; the main segment is an interview with a young person. The interviewer asks questions such as: "If the prophet Muhammad were with us today, what would he say about ___?"

The second part of the show features a hidden camera focused on people in real-life situations. The objective is to discuss what the prophet Muhammad would do in the same situation as the camera's subjects. The third part of the show is a "Did you know?" feature, and the final part of the show is called "They said  about him".

The show has two seasons, each containing 15 episodes. All of the episodes are also available to view on YouTube.

Basis
The idea of the program is based on the book: The guidance of the Prophet's biography in social change,.

International airings 
The show has also been aired in Malaysia via TV AlHijrah, an Islamic-oriented TV station, during the Ramadan of 2011 under its romanized Arabic name "Law Kana Bainana" with Malay subtitles.

See also
 List of Islamic films

References

Arabic-language television shows
Films about Muhammad
Television series about Islam